Photinus brimleyi is a species of firefly in the beetle family Lampyridae. It is found in North America.

References 

Lampyridae
Bioluminescent insects
Beetles described in 1956
Articles created by Qbugbot